Leneve is an unincorporated community in Coos County, Oregon, United States. It lies along North Bank Road off Oregon Route 42 northeast of Coquille. Beaver Slough enters the Coquille River at Leneve.

Named after a pioneer family, its post office operated from April 5, 1917, to May 31, 1934. Post office authorities considered but rejected Conlogue as the name of the office before settling on Leneve.

References

Unincorporated communities in Coos County, Oregon
1917 establishments in Oregon
Unincorporated communities in Oregon